Cordulegaster mzymtae is a species of dragonfly in the family Cordulegastridae. It is found in Georgia and Turkey. Its natural habitat is rivers. It is threatened by habitat loss.

References

Cordulegastridae
Insects described in 1929
Taxonomy articles created by Polbot